Enter the Fat Dragon is a 2020 Hong Kong martial arts comedy film directed by Kenji Tanigaki and Aman Chang from a screenplay by and co-starring Wong Jing, who also acted producer with Connie Wong and lead actor Donnie Yen. The film co-stars Teresa Mo and Niki Chow. The film is a remake of Sammo Hung's 1978 film of the same name.

Plot
A fit police officer becomes overweight after being posted to evidence room and also as a consequence of emotional issues. He is sent to Japan on a mission with a promise of transfer. He fails his mission because of the unsupportive police force. He is forced to be a crimebuster in Japan using his martial arts prowess and with the aid of his Japanese translator.

Cast
Donnie Yen as Fallon Zhu / Zhu Fu Long, the protagonist and an overweight police officer at HKPD. He's Chloe's fiancé, with whom he has a turbulent relationship full of ups and downs, but who saves her when she gets into trouble with Yakuza.
Teresa Mo as Charisma / Christina, a Hong Kong restaurant owner in Shinjuku, Tokyo, Japan and the former lover of Thor. She fled Hong Kong to Japan due to gambling debt.
Wong Jing as Thor, a former inspector of HKPD, and the former lover of Charisma.
Niki Chow as Chloe Song / Chloe Zhu, a famous actress and the fiancée of Fallon Zhu, from whom she takes a break, due to ups and downs in the relationship. 
Naoto Takenaka as Mr. Endo / Inspector Endo (Nihongo: 遠藤さん, Endō-san / 遠藤警部, Endō Keibu), a corrupt chief inspector of Tokyo Metropolitan Police Department.
Tetsu Watanabe as Grandfather  (Nihongo: 祖父, Sofu), the oyabun of Higazhino Group and boss of Shimakura.
Hiro Hayama as Yuji (Nihongo: ゆうじ, Yūji), an adult video director and police informant from Japan who is murdered by Shimakura, a Yakuza boss because of drug smuggling committed by the Higazhino Group (the Yakuza clan headed by Shimakura).
Louis Cheung as Commander Huang, Fallon Zhu's commanding officer in HKPD.
Chaney Lin (Lin Qiu Nan) as Little Tiger, the delivery boy and employee at Charisma's restaurant in Shinjuku, Tokyo. 
Joey Tee as Shimakura (Nihongo: 島倉, Shimakura), a Yakuza boss, leader of Higazhino Group (a Yakuza family from Tokyo) and the main antagonist of the movie. He murdered Yuji (the Japanese informant) because of drug smuggling committed by the Higazhino Group.
Wong Cho-lam as Traffic cop
Lawrence Chou as Police officer
Jerry Lamb as Police officer
Masanori Mimoto as Benny, the underboss of Shimakura at Higazhino Group.
Jim Chim as Bank manager Zhan
Chan Friend as Robber
Bob Lam as Reporter 
Tyson Chak as Reporter
Jessica Jann as Maggie, the English-speaking police officer and the bubble-headed interpreter to Mr. Endo.
Philip Ng as Jack, the main villain from 2005 film SPL: Sha Po Lang (Cameo). 
Note: Jack was originally played by Wu Jing in the 2005 film. 
Anthony Chan as Chief commissioner, the boss of Fallon Zhu and Commander Huang.
Kentaro Shimazu as Goofy, the underboss of Grandfather at Higazhino Group.

Production
Speaking about the film in an interview, lead actor Donnie Yen said that the film is not "necessarily" a remake. Director Wong Jing also stated that it just happens to share the same title. Yen previously played a fat character in a TV commercial in 2015.

Release
Mega-Vision Pictures co-produced and distributed the film in Hong Kong and other territories. The film was released on 23 January 2020 in Hong Kong and selected countries. It was also planned to be released on streaming platforms in China on 1 February 2020.

Reception

See also
 Enter the Fat Dragon 
 Donnie Yen filmography
 Wong Jing filmography

References

External links

2020 films
2020 martial arts films
2020s Cantonese-language films
Films set in Tokyo
Films shot in Japan
Remakes of Hong Kong films
Hong Kong martial arts comedy films
Japan in non-Japanese culture
Yakuza films